A list of films produced in Turkey in the 1970s:

 List of Turkish films of 1970
 List of Turkish films of 1971
 List of Turkish films of 1972
 List of Turkish films of 1973
 List of Turkish films of 1974
 List of Turkish films of 1975
 List of Turkish films of 1976
 List of Turkish films of 1977
 List of Turkish films of 1978
 List of Turkish films of 1979

References

External links
 Turkish films at the Internet Movie Database

1970s
Turkish
Films